Frank Coles is a British-American entrepreneur and a maritime lawyer.

Education 
Coles graduated with a master's degree in maritime law from the University of Wales, Cardiff, United Kingdom.

Career 
Frank Coles was the chief executive officer of Wallem Group, a maritime services company. Before that he was chief executive of a maritime software company, Transas,  now a subsidiary of Wärtsilä. He was a director of Transas Marine.

He worked at sea for 12 years, and as a lawyer for 5 years; he then became operations director for Pacific Basin Bulk Shipping in Hong Kong.

He was formerly president of Inmarsat Maritime and chief executive officer of Globe Wireless.

References 

Year of birth missing (living people)
Living people
British chief executives
British lawyers
Alumni of the University of Wales
American chief executives